Kim Clijsters defeated the defending champion Serena Williams in the final, 7–5, 6–3 to win the singles tennis title at the 2002 WTA Tour Championships. It was her first Tour Finals singles title, fourth title of the season, and tenth career singles title.

Seeds

Note: 
  Amélie Mauresmo had qualified but pulled out due to right knee injury.
  Martina Hingis had qualified but pulled out due to left ankle injury.

Draw

See also
WTA Tour Championships appearances

References

Singles 2002
2002 WTA Tour